The Locust Street Automotive District in St. Louis, Missouri  is a historic district which was listed on the National Register of Historic Places in 2005 and expanded twice, in 2008 and 2016.

The district includes works by Preston J. Bradshaw and by Albert B. Groves.

See also
Locust Street Historic District, in Washington, Missouri in Franklin County

References

National Register of Historic Places in St. Louis
Moderne architecture in the United States
[[Category:Buildings a

nd structures completed in 1911]]

Renaissance Revival architecture in Missouri
Beaux-Arts architecture in Missouri